McHenry Township is located in McHenry County, Illinois. As of the 2010 census, its population was 47,653 and it contained 19,120 housing units. McHenry Township shares the distinction with Nunda Township as being the two largest townships by land area in McHenry County, at  each.

The township was named for William McHenry, an Illinois politician.

Geography

Demographics

References

External links
City-Data.com
Illinois State Archives

Townships in McHenry County, Illinois
Townships in Illinois